Edward Douglas John Hay, 13th Marquess of Tweeddale (6 August 1947 – 1 February 2005), was a Scottish aristocrat best known for his speech in the House of Lords debate (1996) on the Bosnian War.

Edward Douglas John Hay was born on 6 August 1947 as the elder of twin sons. He was educated at Milton Abbey and Trinity College, Oxford (BA Hons).  He became an insurance broker before succeeding his father in the marquessate. Tweeddale was descended from George Hay, 8th Marquess of Tweeddale, the common ancestor of all subsequent holders of the title.  Along with the marquessate and its subsidiary titles he succeeded as Hereditary Chamberlain of Dunfermline.

He rarely spoke in the House of Lords and only achieved fleeting prominence during the Bosnian War debate (28 October 1996) and a subsequent letter to The Times on this subject.

Lord Tweeddale died on 1 February 2005, aged 57, and was succeeded by his younger twin brother Charles Hay.

Family details
The 13th Marquess was the eldest of five sons of David Hay, 12th Marquess of Tweeddale (1921–1979), and his first son (and elder twin son) by his first wife Hon. Sonia Peake, daughter of Osbert Peake, 1st Viscount Ingleby.

The Marquess died unmarried, and was succeeded by his twin brother, Lord Charles, thus becoming one of the few British aristocrats to be succeeded by a younger twin.  The next heir is their youngest brother Lord Alistair Hay, styled Master of Tweeddale as heir presumptive.

Since none of the three brothers (sons of the 12th Marquess's first marriage) is married, the next in succession are their two half-brothers, sons of the 12th Marquess's second marriage. The two half-brothers are also twins, but the older of the two, Lord Andrew Arthur George Hay, is the only one with issue.

Twin brothers succeeding as peers 
The 13th Marquess is remembered chiefly for being one of the few British peers to be succeeded by a younger twin brother.  Similarly, the 3rd Earl of Durham (1855–1928) was succeeded in 1928 by his younger twin brother, the 4th Earl (1855–1929). The 3rd Viscount Knutsford (1855–1935) also succeeded an older twin, the 2nd Viscount (1855–1931 dspm) on 27 July 1931.

Although the 3rd Marquess of Linlithgow and the 1st Baron Glendevon (formerly Lord John Hope) were twins, both were succeeded by their sons.

References
Lord Tweeddale shows Lord Tweeddale's ancestry.
Lord Tweeddale spoke on the Bosnian war in the House of Lords debate.
Lord Tweeddale's death:

External links

1947 births
2005 deaths
20th-century Scottish people
21st-century Scottish people
People educated at Milton Abbey School
Alumni of Trinity College, Oxford
Scottish twins
13
Politicians of the Bosnian War
Tweeddale